The Democratic Party of the Friendly Islands is a political party in Tonga. The party's leader at its foundation was 'Akilisi Pohiva.

The party was launched in September 2010, and included several sitting People's Representatives who were part of the Human Rights and Democracy Movement. Its objectives upon foundation included government transparency and economic reform.

The "Friendly Islands" are a name originally given to Tonga by Captain James Cook.

2010 elections 
The party contested all 17 people's seats in the 2010 elections, winning 12 of them.  Following the election, it secured the support of one independent and was seeking the support of two others – 'Aisake Valu Eke and Sunia Fili – by offering them cabinet posts.

Following the elections, Niuas MP Sosefo Fe’aomoeata Vakata reportedly quit the party to become an independent and support a noble candidate as Prime Minister.

References 

Political parties in Tonga
Political parties established in 2010
2010 establishments in Tonga